The Treaty with Choctaws and Chickasaws was a treaty signed on July 12, 1861 between the Choctaw and Chickasaw (American Indian) and the Confederate States. At the beginning of the American Civil War, Albert Pike was appointed as Confederate envoy to Native Americans. In this capacity he negotiated several treaties, one of the most important being with Cherokee chief John Ross, which was concluded in 1861. The treaty was ratified and proclaimed on December 20, 1861 by the Confederacy. The Choctaw and Chickasaw also duly ratified the treaty.

Some Choctaws identified with The Confederacy and a few owned slaves. In addition, they well remembered and resented the Indian removals from thirty years earlier and poor service they received from the federal government.  The main reason the Choctaw Nation agreed to sign the treaty, however, was for protection from regional tribes.

Terms 
The preamble begins with,

The treaty had 64 terms. The following abbreviated terms of the treaty were:

 Perpetual peace and friendship
 Protection provided by the Confederacy
 Confederacy will not abandon or desert them
 Boundaries defined
 Boundaries defined continued
 Safe passage for Choctaws through Chickasaw district
 Choctaw and Chickasaw nations to give full assent to the provisions of the act of the Confederacy
 Confederacy solemnly guarantees the lands held by the Choctaws and Chickasaws forever
 Land never will be sold
 No state or territory laws of the Confederacy will be passed for the Choctaws and Chickasaws governments
 Confederacy renews leased area from the United States
 Indians in the leased area shall be subject to Confederacy laws until they are capable of self-government or subjected to Choctaw and Chickasaw laws.
 Confederacy waterways are free to Choctaw and Chickasaw nations.
 Choctaw and Chickasaw nations have unrestricted right of self-government
 Intruders in Choctaw or Chickasaw nations subjected to removal by the nations or the Confederacy
 Land tracts set aside for Confederacy agencies
 Confederacy forts in Choctaw and Chickasaw country
 Confederacy right of way for railroads, telegraph lines
 No Settlements or farms near forts, posts, or agencies
 Appointments for Confederacy agent and interpreter
 Protection from other domestic strife, white or Indian hostilities
 Legal assistance, intrusion prevention, and removal of dangerous or improper persons
 Property thief and recovery and payments for property not found
 Licensed traders approved by National Council and trading taxed
 United States laws removed that regulated Choctaw or Chickasaw selling
 Choctaws and Chickasaws can take, hold and pass, purchase or descent lands in any of the Confederate States
 Choctaws and Chickasaws are entitled to one representative in the House of Representatives of the Confederate States of America
 Choctaw and Chickasaw country may be admitted as a state when they elect to do so and become citizens in the Confederate States of America
 Land sales proceeds belong to members of the Choctaw and Chickasaw
 If Creek, Seminole, and Cherokee desire to become part of the Confederate States of America, then their countries maybe annexed to become part of the Choctaw and Chickasaw confederate state
 Choctaw and Chickasaw Nations may incorporate and determine who may be citizens of their respective nation
 Confederate citizens trying to settle Choctaw and Chicaksaw Nations forfeit protection of the Confederate States and maybe uncruelly punished by said nations
 Confederate citizens may not pasture stock on Choctaw or Chickasaw Nations. Confederate citizens may peaceable pass thru Choctaw or Chickasaw Nations, and the Choctaws and Chickasaws have the same privileges in the Confederate States.
 Violators of laws shall be removed.
 Movement and settlement rights, voting rights, and prosecution in each nations courts.
 Criminal jurisdiction
 Return of criminals between Choctaw/Chickasaw Nations and Confederate State of America.
 Creation of a Confederate States district court called Tush-ca-hom-ma to carry out the provisions of this treaty.
 Acts of Congress of the United States will be continued by the Confederate States, provide the common defense and welfare, district court shall have exclusive jurisdiction.
 Tush-ca-hom-ma district shall have the same admiralty jurisdiction as other district courts of the Confederate States.
 Trials for offenses in nation will be held in Confederate States district court.
 Offenses committed before the signing of the treaty will not be prosecuted.

Signatories
There were a total of 36 signatories.

Commissioner of the Confederate States: Albert Pike

Commissioners of the Choctaw Nation: R.M. Jones, Sampson Folsom, Forbis Leflore, Geo. W. Harkins, jr., Allen Wright, Alfred Wade, Coleman Cole, James Riley, Rufus Folsom, William B. Pitchlynn, McKee King, William King, John P. Turnbull, William Bryant.

Commissioners of the Chickasaw Nation: Edmund Pickens, Holmes Colbert, James Gamble, Joel Kemp, William Kemp, Winchester Colbert, Henry C. Colbert, James N. McLish, Martin W. Allen, John M. Johnson, Samuel Colbert, A. Alexander, Wilson Frazier, C. Columbus, Ashalatobbe, John E. Anderson.

Aftermath
From about 1865 to 1918, Mississippi Choctaws were largely ignored by governmental, health, and educational services and fell into obscurity. In the aftermath of the Civil War, their issues were pushed aside in the struggle between defeated Confederates, freedmen and Union sympathizers. 
The Confederacy's loss was also the Choctaw Nation's loss. The Choctaw Nation, in what would be Oklahoma, kept slavery until 1866. After the Civil War, they were required by treaty with the United States to free the slaves within their nation. Former slaves of the Choctaw Nation were called the Choctaw Freedmen. After considerable debate, Choctaw Freedmen were granted Choctaw Nation citizenship in 1885. In post-war treaties, the US government also acquired land in the western part of the territory and access rights for railroads to be built across Indian Territory.

See also 
 List of Choctaw Treaties
 List of treaties of the Confederate States of America

References

Further reading
 Matthews, James M. The Statutes at Large of the Provisional Government of the Confederate States of America, 1864;

External links
 Communication From the Secretary of War
 Confederacy signs treaties with Choctaw and Chickasaw Tribes
 Oklahoma Digital Maps: Digital Collections of Oklahoma and Indian Territory

1861 in the Confederate States of America
1861 treaties
July 1861 events
Native American history of Oklahoma
Native Americans in the American Civil War
Oklahoma Territory
Pre-statehood history of Oklahoma
Treaties of the Confederate States of America
Choctaw
Chickasaw
Choctaw and United States treaties